Symmes Township may refer to:

Symmes Township, Edgar County, Illinois
Symmes Township, Hamilton County, Ohio
Symmes Township, Lawrence County, Ohio

Township name disambiguation pages